The 1994 Cal Poly Mustangs football team represented California Polytechnic State University during the 1994 NCAA Division I-AA football season.

Cal Poly competed in the American West Conference (AWC). The Mustangs were led by first-year head coach Andre Patterson and played home games at Mustang Stadium in San Luis Obispo, California. They finished the season as champion of the AWC, with a record of seven wins and four losses (7–4, 3–0 AWC). Overall, the team was outscored by its opponents 304–334 for the season.

Schedule

Team players in the NFL
No Cal Poly Mustang players were selected in the 1995 NFL Draft.

The following finished their college career in 1994, were not drafted, but played in the NFL.

Notes

References

Cal Poly
Cal Poly Mustangs football seasons
American West Conference football champion seasons
Cal Poly Mustangs football